East Dawning (Dongfang Jibai) is Yum China's fusion of the KFC business model with Chinese cuisine. Chinese food is served exclusively, but the chain focuses on the elements of Chinese cuisine that are more quickly and easily prepared. This excludes some dishes, such as boiled dumplings (jiaozi), but includes steamed pastries such as steamed buns, including the popular xiaolongbao. Soft drinks are eschewed in favor of traditional and modern Chinese drinks such as teas (including milk tea), juices, and soy milk. However, unlike most Chinese fast food, East Dawning uses consistent recipes and preparation methods between restaurants. The restaurants are designed to resemble Chinese homes; for instance, the dining tables are similar to offering tables found in many homes.

A test cafeteria-style restaurant was opened in Shanghai in 2004. After the failure of the test restaurant, Yum! Brands chose the KFC business model (KFC is the most successful Western chain in China) and found greater success. As of the first quarter of 2013, there are 30 East Dawning restaurants in China. The restaurants are located in Shanghai, Beijing, Guangzhou and Suzhou. In 2016, Yum! Brands spun off their Chinese operations into Yum China, which included East Dawning.

Name
The Chinese name "Dongfang Jibai" means "the East has been lit up [by the light of dawn]". It is an idiomatic expression derived ultimately from the last line of the first Red Cliffs, a narrative poem by Song Dynasty poet Su Shi. The last part of the poem describes a group of friends who had so thoroughly enjoyed a dinner party on board a boat, that they "scarcely knew that the East was lit up (by the light of dawn)".

See also 
 List of Chinese restaurants

References

External links 
 Official Website
 2006 Yum! China Division year end summary

Fast-food franchises
Chinese companies established in 2004
Restaurants established in 2004
Fast-food chains of China
Chinese restaurants
Companies based in Shanghai